Bezanjerd Castle is a historical castle located in Bezanjerd in Razavi Khorasan Province, The longevity of this fortress dates back to the More than 200 years.

References 

Castles in Iran